Starr Clark Tin Shop is a historic commercial building located at Mexico in Oswego County, New York. It is a two-story wood-framed vernacular building built about 1827 with Federal details. Its owner, Starr Clark, was a widely recognized abolitionist and supporter of the Underground Railroad.

It was listed on the National Register of Historic Places in 1982.

The Mexico Historical Society has restored the shop and operates it as a museum that highlights its use as a working tin shop and as an hub for the abolition movement.

References

External links
 Starr Clark Tin Shop & Underground Rail Road - official Facebook site
 History and visiting information - National Park Service

Underground Railroad locations
Commercial buildings on the National Register of Historic Places in New York (state)
Commercial buildings completed in 1838
Buildings and structures in Oswego County, New York
Museums in Oswego County, New York
History museums in New York (state)
National Register of Historic Places in Oswego County, New York